Super Junior (Syupeo Junieo) is a South Korean boy band. Formed in 2005 by producer Lee Soo-man of S.M. Entertainment, the group comprised a total of thirteen members at its peak. Super Junior originally debuted with twelve members, consisting of leader Leeteuk, Heechul, Hangeng, Yesung, Kangin, Shindong, Sungmin, Eunhyuk, Siwon, Donghae, Ryeowook and Kibum. Kyuhyun joined the group in 2006.

Film

Television

Web series

Radio

Commercials

See also
 Super Junior videography#Filmography
 List of Leeteuk performances
 List of Kim Hee-chul performances

Notes

References 

Super Junior Shows
South Korean filmographies
Musical group filmographies